Abel Nguéndé Goumba (18 September 1926 – 11 May 2009) was a Central African political figure. During the late 1950s, he headed the government in the period prior to independence from France, and following independence he was an unsuccessful candidate for President of the Central African Republic four times (1981, 1993, 1999, and 2005). Goumba, who was President of the Patriotic Front for Progress (FPP) political party, served under President François Bozizé as Prime Minister from March 2003 to December 2003 and then as Vice President from December 2003 to March 2005. Subsequently, he was appointed to the official post of Ombudsman.

Early life
He was born in 1926 in Grimari, Ouaka Prefecture in the Oubangi-Chari French colony, which is now the Central African Republic. He was a qualified medical doctor and member of the medical faculty in Bangui.

Entry into politics
While the country was still a French colony, Goumba was Vice-President of the Government Council from May 1957 to July 1958, President of the Government Council from July 1958 to December 1958, and was briefly Prime Minister in an acting capacity in April 1959, following the death of Barthélemy Boganda in a plane crash. He was defeated in a political power struggle by David Dacko in 1959 and then became a minor opposition party leader. He was in exile in France from 1960 until 1980. He worked for the World Health Organization in Rwanda and then Benin during the 1970s; while in Rwanda, he met his wife, Anne-Marie. Even after his return to the Central African Republic, he was occasionally arrested for political activity. He feuded with all of Central African Republic's presidents until 2003 and was declared by them to be a national traitor.

1990s
Goumba has a reputation for honesty and integrity. He stressed the importance of governing without corruption. In the 1981 presidential election, which was won by Dacko (who was nevertheless ousted only a few months later), Goumba took less than 2% of the vote, but in the 1993 presidential election he achieved his best result, coming in second place but being defeated by Ange-Félix Patassé in a run-off, in which Goumba took about 46% of the vote. In 1999 he did poorly by comparison, taking only about 6% of the vote and placing fourth, behind Patassé, André Kolingba, and Dacko.

Under Bozizé
After Bozizé seized power on 15 March 2003, ousting Patassé, he appointed Goumba as Prime Minister on 23 March. His government was formed on 31 March 2003; in its composition it was viewed as a compromise between Bozizé and Goumba, with a number of military allies and relatives of Bozizé receiving key posts while other posts went to associates and allies of various political leaders and to independent figures regarded as competent. Goumba kept the portfolio of Minister of Finance himself. The National Transitional Council (CNT) rejected Goumba's proposed programme of general policy on 5 November 2003, saying that the government's objectives, along with the methods of implementing those objectives, were not sufficiently defined in the programme. He had planned to submit a revised programme on 12 December 2003, but on 11 December, Bozizé dismissed him as Prime Minister. On the next day Célestin Gaombalet was named to replace him; Goumba was appointed as Vice-President instead.

2005 candidacy
He was a presidential candidate for the fourth time in the election held on 13 March 2005. Goumba was not expected to win; he received sixth place and 2.51% of the vote. He was one of the five candidates initially approved by the transitional constitutional court on 30 December 2004; seven other candidates were excluded, although six of them were later allowed to run.

On 14 March 2005, the day after the election, members of the Collective of Political Parties of the Opposition (CPPO), including Goumba, signed a petition in which they alleged that fraud had occurred. On 15 March, before the election results became available, Bozizé dismissed Goumba from the Vice-Presidency and the position was abolished. According to presidential spokesman Alain-George Ngatoua, this was because the constitution adopted in December 2004 did not provide for a Vice-President, and the dismissal was unrelated to the quality of Goumba's work; Ngatoua said that Bozizé thanked Goumba for facilitating the transitional process through his "wisdom and courage". Goumba expressed disgust at the manner of his dismissal; he said that he had received no notification of the dismissal and found out about it when it was reported on state radio. Goumba's view was that transitional institutions, including the Vice-Presidency, were supposed to be maintained until the installation of an elected government.

Goumba ran for a seat from Kouango in the 2005 parliamentary election, held concurrently with the presidential election, but was defeated; his wife Anne-Marie won a seat, however.

Retirement
Goumba's son, Alexandre was elected to succeed him as President of his party, Patriotic Front for Progress (FPP), on 5 March 2006, after the elder Goumba was appointed to the official post of Ombudsman. As Ombudsman, he called for the government to negotiate with a rebel group after it captured Birao on 30 October 2006.

He presented the first volume of his memoirs, covering the period from 1956 to 1959, on 14 January 2007.

Goumba died at age 82 on 11 May 2009 at a clinic in Bangui after being taken to hospital the previous evening.

References

1926 births
2009 deaths
People of French Equatorial Africa
Prime Ministers of the Central African Republic
Vice presidents of the Central African Republic
Finance ministers of the Central African Republic
Ombudsmen
Patriotic Front for Progress politicians
People from Ouaka